Eupithecia weissi is a moth in the family Geometridae. It was described by Prout in 1938. It is found in France, Spain and North Africa.

References

External links
Lepiforum.de

Moths described in 1938
weissi
Moths of Europe
Moths of Africa
Taxa named by Louis Beethoven Prout